Iguanacolossus (meaning "Iguana Colossus" or "Colossal Iguana") is a genus of iguanodontian ornithopod dinosaur that lived in North America during the Early Cretaceous period. It is known from UMNH VP 20205, the associated holotype with a large partial skeleton of a single individual.

Discovery and naming

The holotype of Iguanacolossus, UMNH VP 20205, was discovered by Donald D. DeBlieux in 2005, unearthed from the Yellow Cat Member of the Cedar Mountain Formation, Utah; dating from the Valanginian stage in the Early Cretaceous, it wasn't named and described until 2010 by Andrew T. McDonald, James I. Kirkland, Donald D. DeBlieux, Scott K. Madsen, Jennifer Cavin, Andrew R. C. Milner, and Lukas Panzarin, along with the genus Hippodraco, also from the Cedar Mountain Formation. UMNH VP 20205 is assigned to a single individual, including skull elements: fragmented predentary, partial right maxilla, right squamosal, teeth, right and left quadrates. Body remains compromise: vertebrae (cervical, dorsal and caudal), chevrons, ribs, right scapula, right ilium, right pubis, right metatarsals and left fibula. The generic name, Iguanacolossus, is a combination of the reptile genus "Iguana", and the Latin word "colossus" (meaning colossal and/or giant) in relation to the iconic Iguana-like teeth of iguanodontians and the notorious large body size of the specimen. The specific name, "fortis", means mighty. The binomial means "Mighty Iguana Colossus". Additional findings at the Doelling's Bowl site are currently on revision, compromising mostly juvenile material based on lower jaws and humerus. Other remains include a large femur and pubis.

Description

According to McDonald and colleagues, Iguanacolossus differs from other iguanodontians in having a contact surface for supraoccipital on caudomedial process of squamosal curved in caudal view, cranial pubic process with concave dorsal margin but little expansion of its cranial end, postorbital process of the squamosal mediolaterally compressed and blade-like, pubis tapers to a blunt point, cranial extremity of preacetabular process of ilium modified into horizontal boot, axial neural spine blade-like and semi-circular in profile, and the dorsal margin of ilium straight.

The maxilla preserves 14 alveoli, the presence of two concave surfaces suggest an elliptical and elongate antorbital fossa. Based on comparisons with Camptosaurus and Dakotadon, the two isolated teeth are clasiffied as dentary and maxillary, having a shield-shaped crown and lozenge-shaped crown respectively. The scapular bone is almost complete; a denticle is preserved on the predentary, various vertebrae indicate a very iguanodontian-like body shape, specially dorsal vertebrae. The two right metatarsals are classified as metatarsals III and IV based on Camptosaurus and Iguanodon. The right pubis shows derived and plesiomorphic features, seen on related iguanodontians.

Classification

Iguanacolossus was placed in the Iguanodontia, being a styracosternan, a basal subgroup containing the Hadrosauridae and all dinosaurs more closely related to hadrosaurids than to camptosaurids. Below are the results obtained in the phylogenetic analysis performed by its describers in 2010:

Paleoecology

Iguanacolossus was recovered in the Yellow Cat Member from the Cedar Mountain Formation. However, this Member is divided in two beds: Upper and Lower Yellow Cat; Iguanacolossus was unearthed from the Lower bed, where it shared its environment with Theropods: Falcarius, Geminiraptor and Yurgovuchia. The sauropod Mierasaurus and the turtle Naomichelys. There are also indeterminate Goniopholidids crocodiles known from the Lower Yellow Cat.

The other paleofauna is from the Upper Yellow Cat, which includes: Aquatilavipes; Sauropods: Cedarosaurus and Moabosaurus; Iguanodontians: Cedrorestes and Hippodraco; Theropods: Martharaptor and Utahraptor; the nodosaurid Gastonia; Turtles: Glyptops and Trinitichelys; Fish: Ceratodus, Semionotus and indeterminate remains of Hybodontids and Polyacrodontids sharks. Lastly, the mammal Cifelliodon. Additional unnamed genera is known from this bed: U. Sail-backed Iguanodont, U. Eudromaeosaur and Velociraptorine, U. Goniopholidids, U. Mesoeucrocodylian and U. Neochoristodere.

See also
 2010 in paleontology
 Ornithopoda
 Cedar Mountain Formation

References

Iguanodonts
Early Cretaceous dinosaurs of North America
Fossil taxa described in 2010
Taxa named by James I. Kirkland
Paleontology in Utah
Ornithischian genera